South Marion Street Parkway is a historic parkway in Denver, Colorado.  It was listed on the National Register of Historic Places in 1986 as part of a set of listings commemorating Denver's Park and Parkway System.

It is a four-block section which was completed in 1913.

References

Parkways in the United States
Streets in Colorado
National Register of Historic Places in Denver
Geography of Denver
Roads on the National Register of Historic Places in Colorado
Parks on the National Register of Historic Places in Colorado